Rugby union at the 1969 South Pacific Games was hosted at Port Moresby, the capital of Papua New Guinea. Fiji were hot favourites in the tournament and delivered on that promise to comfortably win gold.

Hosts Papua New Guinea, New Caledonia, Solomon Islands and Wallis and Futuna also took part in the tournament.

Medal summary

Men's tournament 
Note: Records for this tournament may be incomplete.

Matches

Final

See also
 Rugby union at the Pacific Games

References

Sources

rugby union
1969
International rugby union competitions hosted by Papua New Guinea
1969 rugby union tournaments for national teams